Lekander Nunatak is a nunatak,  high, standing along the southwest edge of Mackin Table,  northeast of Bessinger Nunatak, in the south of the Patuxent Range, Pensacola Mountains, Antarctica.

It was mapped by the United States Geological Survey from surveys and U.S. Navy air photos, 1956–66, and was named by the Advisory Committee on Antarctic Names after Bryant A. Lekander, a mechanic at South Pole Station, winter 1960. When the original chief petty officer was reassigned, Lekander stepped into that role. He fabricated, from available materials, the grader that smoothed a 10,000 foot runway to accommodate Hercules C-130 aircraft.

Gallery

References

Nunataks of Queen Elizabeth Land